Khotsimsk, also spelled Chocimsk, is an urban-type settlement and the center of Khotsimsk District, in the Mogilev Region of Belarus. The extreme eastern point of Belarus lies to the east of Khotsimsk.

References

Urban-type settlements in Belarus
Populated places in Mogilev Region